Egyházashetye is a village in Vas County, Hungary.

Famous people
The poet Dániel Berzsenyi was born there in 1776.

External links 
 Street map

References

Populated places in Vas County